Ahmed Bey ben Mohamed Sherif, also known as Ahmed Bey or Hadj Ahmed Bey (c. 1784 - c. 1850) was the last Bey of Constantine, in the Regency of Algiers, ruling from 1826 to 1848. He was the successor of Mohamed Menamenni Bey ben Khan. As head of state, he led the local population in a fierce resistance to the French occupation forces. With the position vacant, in 1833 he adopted the title of the leader of Algeria, and the Dey in exile، although this wasn't recognized by any other countries. In 1837 Constantine was taken by the French after an intense siege. In 1837 the territory was conquered by the French. He retreated into the Aurès Mountains from where he continued to wage a sort of Low-intensity conflict using the tribes still loyal to him until he capitulated in 1848.

Early life and career 
Ahmed Bey was born to a Kouloughli father called Mohamed ben Ahmed Chérif, and an Algerian mother called El Hadja Rékia. He was the grandson of Ahmed Bey el Kolli. Barely eighteen years old, the bey Abd Allah gave him the title of Caïd of the El Aouassi (Chief of Harakta tribes). Following the earthquake in the Blida region the dey controlled, he appointed him to Hunah el Kadous, around Algiers, and gives him the enjoyment of haouch Ouled Baba. Ahmed Bey engaged in many pastimes, such as hunting and horse riding. From time to time he took part in expeditions to protect Beylikal troops, who were engaged against hostile Kabyle tribes such as the Beni Menad and the Beni Djenad. During his pilgrimage to Mecca, which lasted fifteen months, in Egypt he met several famous people, including Muhammad Ali Pasha, his son Ibrahim Pasha and Tusun Pasha. He was an avid reformer and wanted to see a modernized and prestigious Algeria loyal to the Ottoman Empire although autonomous, in a similar fashion to Muhammad Ali's Egypt.

Bey of Constantine and French invasion

Appointed Bey of Constantine in 1826, he began modernizing the region based of Muhammad Ali's reforms. He first and foremost sought to reform Constantine based on political and military lines. He established Algeria's first modern manufactories with all the needed machinery and invited foreign specialists. He established a modern military divisions numbering around a few thousand men recruited from Kabyle and Arab tribes. He reformed the political organization of the province, and constructed a new palace for the administration of the province. In 1830 the French invaded Algiers, and took the city. In the capitulation of 1830 the Deylik of Algiers was dissolved, and the French sent out letters demanding capitulation from the 3 governors of the 3 provinces of Algiers. Only the governor of the West capitulated with Ahmed Bey, and Mustapha Boumezrag Bey of Titteri continuing the resistance, whom did not recognized the treaty and declared jihads to restore the Deylik and liberate the French-occupied territories. He came into conflict with Mustapha who declared himself the new Dey-Pasha of Algiers in exile, Although Mustapha was soon forced to capitulate after a French campaign captured his capital in November of 1830. After Boumezrag's fall, he was the only leftover of the old Deylik, and became a rival with the rising Emir Abdelkader over ideological disagreements, as while Abdelkader wanted to instate an independent modernized Islamic state in Algeria,  Ahmed Bey  wanted to restore the old Ottoman Deylik. In 1832 the French took Annaba. He declared himself the Dey-Pasha of Algiers in 1833 after what he called "popular request" from the population of Algiers.

He continued to organize the defence of Constantine, Algeria, and lead several battles against the French army.

He won a massive success in 1836 against maréchal Clauzel. When Constantine was besieged by the French in 1837, Ahmed Bey managed to escape and to organize resistance in the Aurès Mountains. In 1842, he rallies the tribe of Ouled Nasser, hoping to provide support with the Kabyles, and approached the camp of Ain Roumel. On 25 August 1842, French General Jean-René Sillègue enters the land of the Amouchas, namely a village north of Sétif, and met a gathering of two to three thousand Kabyles who failed to stop him. On September 10, the General defeated the Cavalry of Hadj Ahmed Bey at the foot of Djbel Bou Taleb, and manages to destroy his influence on the tribes of the Tell.

Death
Ahmed died on August 30, 1850, 65 years old. According to his wishes, he is buried in Algiers in the Thaalibia Cemetery near the mosque of Sidi Abder Rahman of Algiers in the Casbah of Algiers. His marble mausoleum is surmounted by a turban.

See also 
 List of beys of Constantine, Algeria
 Ottoman Algeria

References

Bibliography 

.

Algerian people of Turkish descent
Beys of Constantine, Algeria
People from Constantine, Algeria
1780s births
1850 deaths